Aframomum stanfieldii is a species in the ginger family, Zingiberaceae. It was first described by Frank Nigel Hepper.

Range
Aframomum stanfieldii is native from Western Tropical Africa to Cameroon.

References 

stanfieldii